Xoxo (pronunciation: sho-sho) is a settlement in the northeastern part of the island of Santo Antão in Cape Verde. The settlement lies in Cova-Paul-Ribeira da Torre Natural Park. The Ribeira da Torre flows through the settlement. The only road to Xoxo goes from Ribeira Grande through the Ribeira da Torre valley.

See also
List of villages and settlements in Cape Verde

References

Villages and settlements in Santo Antão, Cape Verde
Cova-Paul-Ribeira da Torre Natural Park
Ribeira Grande Municipality